Esmeralda Zenteno Urizar (Antofagasta, July 18, 1880–1967), known by her pseudonym Vera Zouroff, was a Chilean feminist, editor, writer, novelist, poet, and correspondent.  Lecturing on Socialismo en Chile, she advocated the form of socialism which gives women a share in the practical direction of the world. She also provided a leadership role at the Centro Femenino de Estudio in Santiago. Zenteno married Arturo León del Río, after which she was known as Esmeralda Zenteno de León. She had five children.

Partial works 
 Martha (1916)
 ¡Liberación! (1919)
 México fuera y dentro de sus fronteras (1932)
 Hollywood (1932)
 Feminismo obrero (1933)
 La guerra (1937)
 Devocionario dedicado a celebrar las dieciocho apariciones de la Sna. Virgen en la Gruta de Lourdes (1939)
 El arte de la declamación: enseñanza y práctica de este arte (1945)
 El Cenáculo de poesía a sus poetas (1947)
 O’Higgins : libertador de Chile, gran mariscal del Perú (1949)
 Evocaciones del Perú (1949)
 Beatriz Sandoval (1954)

References

1880 births
Year of death missing
Chilean editors
Chilean women novelists
Chilean women editors
Chilean women poets
20th-century Chilean women writers
20th-century Chilean poets
20th-century Chilean novelists
Chilean feminist writers
Chilean socialist feminists